Elekmania barahonensis is a species of the genus Elekmania.

References

External links

Senecioneae